HC Tallinn is an Estonian sport club, which is located in Tallinn. The club focuses on handball, and competes in Meistriliiga.

The club was established in 2011.

References

External links
 
Team page at eurohandball.com

Estonian handball clubs
Sport in Tallinn
2011 establishments in Estonia
Handball clubs established in 2011